Anthicus cervinus, the cloudy flower beetle, is a species of antlike flower beetle in the family Anthicidae. It is found in Central America and North America.

References

Further reading

External links

 

Anthicidae
Articles created by Qbugbot
Beetles described in 1849
Beetles of North America